Beena Banerjee (born 19 February 1943), also known as Beena or Bina, is an Indian actress in Bengali and Hindi films and television.

Biography 
Beena Banerjee was born as Beena Batabyal on 19 February 1943, the daughter of film actor Pradeep Kumar (originally Pradeep Batabyal, also, Pradeep Bannerjee) (1925–2001). She married Ajoy Biswas, an actor and film director, but they separated. She has a son, Siddharth Banerjee, who has worked as assistant director to Sajid Khan in two films, namely Housefull 2 (2012) and Himmatwala (2013).

Filmography

Television

References

External links
 

1943 births
Living people
20th-century Bengalis
20th-century Indian actresses
21st-century Bengalis
21st-century Indian actresses
Actresses in Hindi cinema
Actresses in Bengali cinema
Indian film actresses
Indian television actresses
Place of birth missing (living people)